Sai Prashanth (7 June 1985 – 13 March 2016) was an Indian actor, who has appeared in Tamil language films and television serials. He has acted in films including Barathi, Aintham Padai, Thegidi, Neram (2013) and Vadacurry (2014). He studied in Shrine Vailankanni Senior Secondary School, T.Nagar, Sri Ahobila math Oriental higher secondary school, West Mambalam, and his father was Chief Executive in Chennai Doordharshan TV channel.

Career

The assignment Sai got was the role of a kid with drawing talents by Muktha Films in the mega serial called Vidya in DDK. while he was studying in Ahobila Mutt Oriental high school, He was called by Gnana Rajasekaran, IAS, to take up the role of young poet Bharathi in his film Bharathi shot in Varanasi to portray his days of education. He did this role along with the famous illustrious Actor Sayaji Shinde of Maharashtra. Coming back from Kasi, he was referred to Bombay Chanakya by Director and cameraman Thangarbachan to do a role in Veettukku veedu looty as a young computer savvy palaghat lad.

But his film career started with recital of the first sloka of the first veda " ganaanaam thvaa...in screen, that too on the banks of Ganges.

Sai Prashanth  in entertainment career took up the role of  a video jockey on Sun Music abruptly after another anchor had fallen ill. He subsequently applied for a full-time role, got the offer and then moved on to work in television serials.

A playful youth role played by him Annamalai serial by Radaan suddenly changed into a terrific Villain role by the new Director CJ Baskar which earned him the name of Junior Nambiar by the masses.
As a serial actor, he often played negative roles and collaborated for several ventures with Raadhika's productions. Sai Prashanth has also appeared on the reality dance shows Maanada Mayilada and Jodi Number One as a contestant, while he hosted other shows including Dhil Dhil Manadhil.

He has also acted in films including Mundhinam Paartheney (2010), Neram (2013) and Thegidi (2014) in supporting roles. In Vadacurry (2014), he appeared as the lead antagonist.

Family 
His mother Lalitha Subhash was the former president of Tamil Nadu BJP and was also a member of the Regional Censor Board. He had a daughter, Rakshitha Prashanth, from his first marriage with Niranjana.

Death
Prashanth committed suicide by consuming a poisoned drink at his home on 13 March 2016.

Filmography

Films

Television
Annamalai
Veetukku Veedu Lootty
Krishna Cottage
Selvi
Arasi
Muhurtham
Idhayam
Magal
Thamarai
 Muthaaram
 Kasthuri 
Illavarasi
 Anni by KB sir,
 Ma Inti Mahalakshmi - Telugu
 Lakshmi Nivasam 
 Vidya in DDK 
 Agalya
 Nimmadi by AVM 
 Kannadi Pookkal  in Vijay
 Vijay TV Jodi no.1 dance show 
 Maanada Mayilaada - Dance show in Kalaingar TV.
 Dil Dil Manathil in Kalaignar TV 
 Ethirneechchal 
 Amul Super Kudumbam a variety show series in Sun TV
 Yazhini by Sundar K Vijayan - a tele film released in UK
 Veedu manaivi makkal a family reality show on celebrities.

References

External links

1985 births
2016 deaths
Male actors in Tamil cinema
21st-century Indian male actors
Indian male film actors
Indian male television actors
Suicides in India
Suicides by poison
Tamil male television actors
2016 suicides
Artists who committed suicide